Events from the year 1259 in Ireland.

Incumbent
Lord: Henry III

Events
 The first record of gallowglass service, when Aedh Ó Conchobair, King of Connacht, received a dowry of 160 Scottish warriors from the daughter of Dubhghall mac Ruaidhri, the King of the Hebrides.
 Fromund Le Brun became Lord Chancellor of Ireland

Births

References